The Skyline Commissary (also known as the Rock Store) is a historic building in Skyline, Alabama.  It was built in 1935 as part of Skyline Farms, a project of the Resettlement Administration, a New Deal program that sought to provide jobs for unemployed farmers on collective farms.  The commissary sold food to both co-op members and surrounding residents, and served as the hub of social activity for the community.  The co-op operated until the end of World War II, when it was sold to private owners.  The commissary continued to operate as a general store for the community until the early 2000s.  It was converted into a heritage museum in 2005.  Like other New Deal structures, the commissary makes heavy use of local materials.  The walls are of locally quarried limestone, and the façade features a pedimented portico covering double entry doors.  The entry is flanked by two large, multi-paned fixed windows.  A gable-roofed ell was added to the north of the rear side in 1937.  The house was listed on the National Register of Historic Places in 2013.

The Skyline Farms Heritage Association owns the building and operates it as the Rock Store Museum. It is open on a limited basis.

References

National Register of Historic Places in Jackson County, Alabama
Buildings and structures completed in 1935
Museums in Jackson County, Alabama